Davenport House is an historic building in the English village of Duntisbourne Abbots, Gloucestershire. Located on the eastern side of the village, it was built in the 17th century, and is now a Grade II listed building.

References

17th-century establishments in England
Grade II listed houses in Gloucestershire
Houses completed in the 17th century
Cotswold District